The 2013 Chrono Champenois – Trophée Européen is the 24th running of the Chrono Champenois – Trophée Européen, a women's individual time trial bicycle race in France and was held on 15 September 2013 over a distance of . It was one of the few single time trial events on the 2013 women's cycling calendar and was the last test before the time trial at the 2013 UCI Road World Championships. It is rated by the UCI as a 1.1 category race. The time trial started and finished in Bétheny and the course went through: Bourgogne, Fresne, Pomacle, Caurel, Berru and Witry-lès-Reims.

Ellen van Dijk from the Netherlands won the time trial ahead of  teammate Carmen Small from the United States. Shara Gillow from Australia finished in third place.

Results

Source

See also

 2007 Chrono Champenois – Trophée Européen
 2008 Chrono Champenois – Trophée Européen
 2010 Chrono Champenois – Trophée Européen

References

External links

2013 in French sport
Chrono Champenois – Trophée Européen
2013 in women's road cycling